Q1 Tower (an abbreviation of Queensland Number One) is a  supertall skyscraper in Queensland, Australia. The residential tower on the Gold Coast was the world's tallest residential building from 2005 to 2011. As of September 2022, it is the 14th tallest residential tower in the world, the tallest building in Australia, the second tallest building in the Southern Hemisphere, and the third-tallest free-standing structure in the Southern Hemisphere, behind the Autograph Tower in Jakarta, Indonesia, and the Sky Tower in Auckland, New Zealand. The Q1 officially opened in November 2005.

The landmark building was recognised as one of Queensland's icons during the state's 150th-birthday celebrations.

Height
However, according to the ranking system developed by the U.S.-based Council on Tall Buildings and Urban Habitat, the main criterion by which buildings are ranked is the height of the top of the spire, qualifying Q1 as the taller.

When the Q1 was completed, it overtook the 21st Century Tower in Dubai, United Arab Emirates to become the world's tallest residential tower. When measured to its structural point, it dwarfs the Gold Coast skyline, with the closest buildings to Q1's height being the  North Tower of Circle on Cavill and the  Soul building.

Design and construction

Q1 Tower was designed by SDG & The Buchan Group, and its form was inspired by the Sydney 2000 Olympic torch and the Sydney Opera House. The name was given in honour of members of Australia’s Olympic sculling team of the 1920s – Q1.

The concept was based on studies of wind, movement and tension, in which a series of ribbons wrap concentrically around the tower’s exterior and hover above the entry plaza area, providing cover and shade. The tension in the movement and free form are expressed by the gradual twisting of the aluminium-clad ribbons as they move around the building. The result is an open-air galleria-like shopping precinct under the glazed ribbon structure and a curved retail façade to the street edges.

The project was developed by The Sunland Group and built by Sunland Constructions. The building was the Silver Award winner of the 2005 Emporis Skyscraper Award, coming in second to Turning Torso in Sweden.

Q1 was completed towards the end of 2005. Its main point of difference to other high-rise buildings in Surfers Paradise is its glass-enclosed sleek look. Q1's lift lobby is separated into two high-speed lift groups. Four high-speed lifts service levels B2 to level 42. Three separate high-speed lifts service levels 43 to the penthouse on level 74.

Q1 contains one-, two- and three-bedroom units. Building facilities include two lagoon swimming pools, a lap pool, gymnasium, small theatre, a ballroom and a spa centre.

An application to construct a walkway around the outside of level 78 was lodged with the Gold Coast City Council in mid-2010.

Awards 
In 2009 as part of the Q150 celebrations, Q1 was announced as one of the Q150 Icons of Queensland for its role as a "structure and engineering feat".

Observation deck

SkyPoint, formerly known as QDeck, is an observation deck at levels 77 and 78. It is Australia's only beachside observation deck and has room for 400 people. The express elevator to the observation deck travels the 77 floors in 43 seconds.

Building condition

In 2009, reports of disrepair and poor building conditions emerged. Peeling paint which has revealed rusty steel inside and outside, as well as shattered glass panels are amongst the visible concerns. The Building Services Authority has confirmed it has received complaints in relation to the building. The north stairwell was assessed as defective due to the stairwell pressurisation system not meeting the minimum air-flow requirements during a fire emergency. The Building Services Authority asked Q1's builders to rectify the problem in July 2010.

Events
Q1 has been used as a fireworks launch site during New Year's Eve celebrations. The building is one of the most popular destinations for students celebrating schoolies week, despite the body corporate committee treasurer's claims that most of the building's unit owners were opposed to their stay.

On 28 March 2007, two BASE jumpers made an early-morning illegal jump from a northern side apartment. The skydivers pleaded guilty in the Southport Magistrates' Court and were fined A$750 without a conviction being recorded.

At , the SkyPoint Climb at Q1 is Australia’s highest external building climb.

Q1 has been holding an annual Stair Climb event for a number of years. It is uncertain whether this will be held in 2020.

Gallery

See also

 D1
 List of skyscrapers
 List of tallest buildings in Australia
 List of tallest buildings on the Gold Coast, Queensland
 List of tallest freestanding structures in the world

References

External links

 Q1 Resort & Spa
 Q1 Observation Deck (SkyPoint)
 Q1 on CTBUH Skyscraper Center (archived 5 November 2013)
 Q1 at Emporis (archived 10 September 2004)

Skyscrapers on the Gold Coast, Queensland
Buildings and structures completed in 2005
Residential skyscrapers in Australia
Tourist attractions on the Gold Coast, Queensland
Surfers Paradise, Queensland
Q150 Icons
Observation towers in Australia